Sara Lisa Sofia Persson (born 23 September 1980) is a Swedish badminton player. Persson won the women's singles title at the Swedish National Championships in 2002 representing Täby Badmintonförening (now Göteborgs BK), and repeating it consecutively from 2005-2008. She competed at the Beijing 2008 Olympic Games, but defeated in the first round to Petya Nedelcheva of Bulgaria with the score 10–21, 10–21. Her sister, Johanna Persson, is also an Olympian who competed at the 2004 Summer Olympics in Athens, Greece.

Achievements

BWF International Challenge/Series 
Women's singles

 BWF International Challenge tournament
 BWF International Series tournament

References

External links 
 
 
 

Swedish female badminton players
Living people
1980 births
People from Danderyd Municipality
Sportspeople from Stockholm
Badminton players at the 2008 Summer Olympics
Olympic badminton players of Sweden
21st-century Swedish women